Luca Barlocco (born 20 February 1995) is an Italian footballer who plays as a left back for  club Virtus Entella.

Club career

Atalanta
Born in Merate, Lombardy, Barlocco started his career at Lombard club Atalanta.

Juventus
On 2 September 2013 Juventus signed half of the registration rights for €1.25 million, with half of the registration rights of Edoardo Ceria and Prince-Désir Gouano moved to Atalanta for €800,000 and €450,000 respectively. Barlocco signed a 5-year contract.

In June 2014 the co-ownership deals were renewed (except Gouano and Troisi). On 26 July Barlocco was signed by Piedmontese club Novara in a temporary deal. He was injured in the 2014–15 Coppa Italia match against Latina in August. Barlocco played his only league game on 6 September.

On 16 January 2015 the loan was terminated. On 19 January 2015 Barlocco was signed by Como.

On 24 June 2015 Juventus signed Barlocco for €950,000 (€450,000 cash plus Ceria).

On 31 July Barlocco, Cais, Gerbaudo and Tavanti were signed by Carrarese.

In the season 2016–17 took the loan, for a season, to Alessandria.

In Summer 2017 he is again loaned for Pro Vercelli for a season.

On 30 June 2019, Barlocco joined Vicenza on a two-year contract with an option for one further year.

On 6 July 2021, he signed a two-year contract with Virtus Entella.

International career
Barlocco was a player in 2012 UEFA European Under-17 Championship qualification. He made 2 starts in the first stage of qualification: Daniele Zoratto had replaced Ivan Rondanini and Filipo Penna (who played the first match) with Barlocco and Luca Lotti.

References

External links
 Profile at Italian Football Federation 
 

1995 births
Living people
People from Merate
Footballers from Lombardy
Italian footballers
Association football defenders
Serie B players
Serie C players
Atalanta B.C. players
Juventus F.C. players
Novara F.C. players
Carrarese Calcio players
U.S. Alessandria Calcio 1912 players
F.C. Pro Vercelli 1892 players
Piacenza Calcio 1919 players
L.R. Vicenza players
Virtus Entella players
Italy youth international footballers
Sportspeople from the Province of Lecco